Ayala Corporation (Spanish: Corporación Ayala, formerly Ayala y Compañía (Ayala & Company)) is the publicly listed holding company for the diversified interests of the Ayala Group.  Founded in the Philippines by Domingo Róxas and Antonio de Ayala during the Spanish colonial rule, it is the country's oldest and largest conglomerate.  The company has a portfolio of diverse business interests, including investments in retail, education, real estate, banking, telecommunications, water infrastructure, renewable energy, electronics, information technology, automotive, healthcare, management, and business process outsourcing. As of November 2015, it is the country's largest corporation in terms of assets ($48.7B).

History
Ayala y Compañía was established in 1876 and traces its origins to Casa Róxas, a partnership established in 1834 between Domingo Róxas and Antonio de Ayala. Casa Róxas began with the formation of a distillery which became known as the maker of Ginebra San Miguel. The distillery ultimately known as the Ayala Distillery was acquired by La Tondeña, Inc. in 1929.

In 1888, the company introduced the first tramcar service in the Philippines. The company participated in the construction of the Ayala Bridge over the Pasig River in Manila. Originally built of wood in 1872, the bridge was reconstructed in steel in 1908 to become the first steel bridge in the Philippines. The company was responsible for the urban development of Makati after World War II.

Ayala y Compañía shifted from a partnership to a corporation with the establishment of Ayala Corporation in 1968 and became Public company in 1976. Ayala Corporation welcomed the minority investment of Mitsubishi Corporation as its strategic partner in 1974.

In 2011, Ayala Corporation began building its renewable energy portfolio, beginning with a joint venture with Mitsubishi for solar power and Sta. Clara Power for run-of-the-river hydro power, and the purchase of the iconic Northwind farm for wind power. Ayala will contribute 1000 MW to the Philippine power supply, by 2015. FinanceAsia named Ayala Corporation as the best-managed company in the Philippines in 2010 and 2015, as well as best for corporate governance and best for corporate social responsibility.

Attached companies and investments

Real estate 
 Alveo Land 
 Ayala Land Inc.
 AyalaLand Logistics Holdings Corp. (ALLHC)
 Ayala Malls
 Makati Development Corp. (MDC)
 AG Holdings, Ltd.
 Avida Land 
 Amaia Land 
 Bellavita 
 Portico Land Corp. - joint venture with Mitsubishi Corporation
 Roxas Land Corp. - joint venture with Bank of the Philippine Islands and Hongkong Land
 Regent Wise Investments Limited
 MCT Consortium Berhad (32.95% ownership, based in Malaysia)
 Ortigas & Company Limited Partnership - Since November 2014, Ayala and SM Prime Holdings ended their dispute over the ownership of OCLP Holdings, the parent of Ortigas & Company. Ayala has recently sealed a deal with a group led by Ignacio Ortigas for the development of the Ortigas family's land bank area.
 Trident Infrastructure and Development Corporation (TIDC) - Formerly known as "Team Trident" and "the super consortium", is a joint-venture between Aboitiz Equity Ventures, Inc. (AEV), Ayala Land Inc. (ALI), Megaworld Corporation (MEG) and SM Prime Holdings, Inc. (SMPH). It is aimed to develop the Laguna Lakeshore Expressway and Dike Project (LLEDP).
 Ayala-GT Capital - In May 2015, through Ayala's Alveo Land and GT Capital's Federal Land, the two corporations will develop a 45-hectare property in Biñan, Laguna, aimed towards mid-range and high-end markets.

Financial services 
 Bank of the Philippine Islands
 GCash

Telecommunications 
 Globe Telecom, Inc.

Utilities 
 Manila Water Company Inc.

Power and transport 
 AirSWIFT
 Ayala Corporation Energy Holdings, Ltd. - is the power unit of Ayala Corporation, with investments in the development of conventional as well as solar, wind, and mini-hydro energy sources.
 AC Infrastructure Holdings Corp. - pursues toll road, rail and airport projects under government's public-private partnership program. 
Muntinlupa–Cavite Expressway - The  4 km.,  4-lane  expressway  connects  the  Daang  Hari  and  Daang  Reyna  roads  in  Las  Pinas/Bacoor.
 Light Rail Manila Corporation - a consortium between the Ayala Corporation, Metro Pacific Investments Corporation, and Sumitomo Corporation for the Line 1 Common Station, Concession, and Bacoor Extension. 
 AF Payments, Inc. (10%) - another consortium between the Ayala Corporation and Metro Pacific Investments Corporation regarding the unified Automated Fare Collection System (Beep card) for Line 1-3, and eventually also for the PNR and other public transport.
 North Avenue Grand Central station - the Unified Grand Central Station, is an interchange station currently in development by its stakeholders Metro Pacific Corporation, SMC-MRT7 of San Miguel Corporation, SM Prime Holdings, and Ayala Corporation.
 Entrego (60%) - courier and express parcel management that serve Zalora Philippines.

Manufacturing and automotive 
 AC Industrial Technology Holding, Inc. (AC Industrials)
 Integrated Micro-Electronics, Inc. (IMI)
 Honda Cars Makati, Inc. and Honda Cars Cebu, Inc. - Established in October 1990, Ayala Automotive Holdings began with a 12.9% stake in the P1.1B investment for the local operations and production plant of Honda Cars Philippines.
 Isuzu Automotive Dealership, Inc.
 Isuzu Philippines Corporation (IPC) (owns 15%)
 Volkswagen Philippines 
 Maxus Philippines, Inc 
 Kia Philippines, Inc
 Adventure Cycle Philippines, Inc. (KTM Philippines)
 ACI Solar Holdings North America
 Merlin Solar Technologies Inc.
 AC Industrials Singapore
 Misslbeck Technologies GmbH

Social infrastructure 
Ayala Healthcare Holdings, Inc.
 Healthway Philippines
 Generika - Drugstore chain, with 50% stake
 MedGrocer 
 QualiMed - Hospitals and clinics, a joint-venture with Mercado General Hospital Inc.(MGHI) and Ayala Land, Inc.
Ayala Education, Inc. (AEI)
 University of Nueva Caceres - Ayala Education's flagship University 
 Affordable Private Education Center, Inc. (APEC Schools) - a joint venture between the Ayala Corporation and Pearson PLC's Affordable Learning Fund (Pearson ALF). It promotes affordable but high-quality education.
 Professional Employment Program (PEP) 
 National Teacher's College (33%)

Nonprofit organizations 
 Ayala Foundation
 CENTEX
 Ayala Museum
 Philippine Development Foundation
 Ayala Technology Business Incubator
 Filipinas Heritage Library
 Ayala Social Initiatives

Business process outsourcing, Logistics and Digital businesses 
 LiveIt Investments, Ltd.
 Affinity Express
 HRMall
 Zalora Philippines

Divestments
 Grail Research
 IQ BackOffice, Inc.
 The Insular Life Assurance Co., Ltd. - Mutual company owned by policyholders since 1987.
 Integreon
 Philippine FamilyMart CVS, Inc. - Joint venture with Stores Specialists, Inc., Japan FamilyMart, and Itochu Corporation. Acquired by Phoenix Petroleum Philippines, Inc. in 2018.
Pilipinas Makro Inc. (defunct) - initially a joint venture partnership between Ayala, SM Investments Corporation (SM Prime Holdings), and the Netherlands' SHV Holdings NV formed to own and operate Makro branches in the Philippines. Ayala divested from the company in 2004.
 Pure Foods Corporation - sold to San Miguel Corporation in 2001.
 Stream Global Services - sold to Convergys in 2014 for $820 million.

Retirement of Jaime Zóbel de Ayala
In January 2006, the board of directors publicly announced the decision by Jaime Zóbel de Ayala to retire as chairman of the corporation by April 2006.  The board also announced his appointment as chairman emeritus upon his retirement. His eldest son, Jaime Augusto Zóbel de Ayala, succeeded him as chairman and chief executive officer, while his younger son, Fernando Zóbel de Ayala, has assumed the position of president and chief operating officer. The Zóbel de Ayala family's holding company, Mermac, Inc., continues to hold the controlling stake (49%) in Ayala Corporation.

References

External links
 Ayala Corporation website
  Ayala at 175 magazine
 Philippine Stock Exchange Information Page on Ayala Corporation

 
Conglomerate companies of the Philippines
Financial services companies of the Philippines
Holding companies of the Philippines
Companies based in Makati
Makati Central Business District
Financial services companies established in 1834
1834 establishments in the Philippines
Companies listed on the Philippine Stock Exchange